Investigative Documentaries is a Philippine television investigative journalism program broadcast by GMA News TV. Hosted by Malou Mangahas, it premiered on March 3, 2011. The show concluded on March 12, 2020. It was replaced by Home Work in its timeslot.

Overview
The show is hosted by Philippine Center for Investigative Journalism head Malou Mangahas. It features different issues that the Philippines is facing.

Production
The production was halted in March 2020 due to the enhanced community quarantine in Luzon caused by the COVID-19 pandemic.

Accolades

References

External links
 
 

2011 Philippine television series debuts
2020 Philippine television series endings
Filipino-language television shows
GMA Integrated News and Public Affairs shows
GMA News TV original programming
Philippine documentary television series
Television productions suspended due to the COVID-19 pandemic